William Penn High School, also known as William Penn or simply Penn, is a four-year comprehensive, coeducational public high school located in unincorporated New Castle County, Delaware, United States. It is adjacent to the New Castle city limits and has a New Castle postal address. The school is a member of the Colonial School District, and is the largest high school in the state of Delaware.  The school mascot is the Colonial.

In addition to New Castle the school district includes Delaware City, Port Penn, St. Georges, Wilmington Manor, portions of Wilmington, and half of Bear.

Notable alumni

Cliff Brumbaugh, baseball player
Dave May, professional baseball player
Brett Oberholtzer, baseball player
Brian Oliver, professional basketball player
Jeff Otah, professional football player, Carolina Panthers
Kyle Carter, professional football player, Minnesota Vikings
Devin Smith, professional basketball player for Maccabi Tel Aviv
Richard B. Weldon, Jr., former Frederick County (MD) Commissioner and member of the Maryland House of Delegates

See also
List of high schools in Delaware
Colonial School District (Delaware)
William Penn

References

External links

High schools in New Castle County, Delaware
Public high schools in Delaware
Buildings and structures in New Castle, Delaware
1921 establishments in Delaware
Educational institutions established in 1921